Barbara Buhler Lynes is an art historian, curator, professor, and preeminent scholar on the art and life of Georgia O'Keeffe.  She retired on February 14, 2020 from her position as the Sunny Kaufman Senior Curator at the NSU Museum of Art in Fort Lauderdale, Florida to continue her scholarly work on O'Keeffe and American modernism.  From 1999-2012, she served as the founding curator of the Georgia O'Keeffe Museum in Santa Fe, New Mexico, where she curated or oversaw more than thirty exhibitions of works by O’Keeffe and her contemporaries. Lynes was also the Founding Emily Fisher Landau Director of the Georgia O'Keeffe Museum Research Center from 2001-2012. Prior to her work at the Georgia O'Keeffe Museum, Lynes served as an independent consultant to the National Gallery of Art in Washington, D.C. from 1992-1999 and has taught art history at Vanderbilt University, Dartmouth College, Montgomery College, and the Maryland Institute College of Art (MICA).

Lynes holds a PhD in French Literature from the University of California, Riverside and a PhD in Art History from Indiana University Bloomington. She has written books, book chapters, and essays on O'Keeffe and other American modernists, including the award-winning two volume Georgia O'Keeffe catalogue raisonné (1999) that documents and authenticates O'Keeffe's extensive oeuvre.

Books
Exhibiting O'Keeffe: The Making of an American Modernist: Museum of Modern Art 1946, 2023 {{https://publications.okeeffemuseum.org/exhibiting-okeeffe/)}
O'Keeffe and Moore, 2023 
O'Keeffe: A Life Well Lived, 2020 
Wiliiam J. Glackens and Pierre-Auguste Renoir: Affinities and Distinctions, 2018 
Georgia O'Keeffe: Abstracting Nature, 2018  
Georgia O'Keeffe; un phénomène américain: questions d'identité, 2015 
Photography Changes Our Public Image, 2012 
Georgia O'Keeffe and Her Houses: Ghost Ranch and Abiquiu, 2012 
Georgia O'Keeffe in New Mexico: Architecture, Katsinam, and the Land, 2012 
Georgia O'Keeffe, 2011 
Shared Intelligence: American Painting and The Photograph, 2011 
Georgia O'Keeffe: Abstraction, 2009 
Susan Rothenberg: Moving in Place, 2009 
Georgia O'Keeffe and the Camera: The Art of Identity, 2008 
Georgia O'Keeffe and Ansel Adams: Subjects of Self, 2008 
Georgia O'Keeffe and Marsden Hartley in New Mexico, 2008 
The 1980s: A Virtual Discussion, 2007 
Georgia O'Keeffe Museum Collections, 2007 
Georgia O'Keeffe: Identity and Place, 2007 
Introduction and Overview: Visiting Georgia O'Keeffe, 2006
Moments in Modernism—Georgia O'Keeffe and Andy Warhol: Flowers of Distinction, 2005 
Museums of Tomorrow: A Virtual Discussion, 2004 
Georgia O'Keeffe and New Mexico : A Sense of Place, 2004 
Maria Chabot—Georgia O'Keeffe: Correspondence 1941-1949, 2003 
Georgia O'Keeffe Museum: Highlights of the Collection, 2003 
Postmodernism: A Virtual Discussion, 
Georgia O'Keeffe and the Calla Lily in American Art, 1860-1940, 2002 
Georgia O'Keeffe, 1916 and 1917: My Own Tune, 2001 
O'Keeffe's O'Keeffes: The Artist's Collection, 2001 
O'Keeffe on Paper, 2000 
Georgia O'Keeffe : Catalogue Raisonné, 1999 
Georgia O'Keeffe, 1993 
The Language of Criticism: Its Effect on Art of Georgia O'Keeffe, 1992 
O'Keeffe and Feminism: A Problem of Position, 1992 
O'Keeffe, Stieglitz and the Critics, 1916-1929, 1989

References

American art curators
American women curators
American art historians
Living people
Year of birth missing (living people)
American women historians
Women art historians
21st-century American women